Sir John Paul Stanley (born 19 January 1942) is a British Conservative Party politician who was the Member of Parliament (MP) for Tonbridge and Malling from 1974 to 2015.

Education

Stanley was educated at two independent schools: at Copthorne Preparatory School near Crawley in West Sussex and Repton School in the village of Repton in Derbyshire, followed by Lincoln College at the University of Oxford, where he read Modern History. He also studied at Syracuse University.

Early career
Stanley was at the Institute for Strategic Studies from 1968 to 1969. He worked for Rio Tinto-Zinc Corp Ltd (RTZ) from 1969 to 1979. He is a Senior Network Member at the European Leadership Network (ELN).

Parliamentary career
Stanley contested the Newton seat in 1970. He was first elected to Parliament at the February 1974 election, prior to which he had worked for the Conservative Research Department as an advisor on housing policy. He was Parliamentary Private Secretary to Margaret Thatcher from 1976 to 1979, during her time as Leader of the Opposition.

He was made Minister of State with responsibility for housing at the Department of the Environment following the Conservative victory at the 1979 general election. Four years later he was moved to become Minister of State for the Armed Forces in the Ministry of Defence. Following the 1987 general election Stanley was moved to the Northern Ireland Office, once again as Minister of State, but left the government front bench in 1988 and remained on the back benches thereafter. He was mainly interested in defence and foreign policy, having sat on the Foreign Affairs Select Committee from 1992 onwards. 

He was re-adopted as the Conservative party candidate for his constituency in 2008 for the 2010 general election. In March 2012, Stanley announced that he would stand down at the next general election.

In May 2014, The Independent reported that Stanley had received fees worth thousands of pounds for consultancy work for one of the big City investors who were granted priority access to shares in Royal Mail plc, which the Coalition government had decided to privatise.

Personal life
He married Susan Giles on 21 December 1968 in the City of London; they later divorced. The couple had a son and daughter.

Honours
 He was sworn in as a member of Her Majesty's Most Honourable Privy Council on 16 June 1984. This was announced in the 1984 Queen's Birthday Honours List. This gave him the Honorific Prefix "The Right Honourable" for Life.
 He was knighted on 13 December 1988. This allowed him to be referred to as "Sir John Stanley".

References

External links
 Guardian Unlimited Politics – Ask Aristotle: Sir John Stanley MP
 TheyWorkForYou.com – John Stanley MP
 Tonbridge and Malling Conservatives
 The Public Whip – John Stanley MP voting record
 BBC News – John Stanley MP  profile 10 February 2005
 

1942 births
Living people
Conservative Party (UK) MPs for English constituencies
Members of the Privy Council of the United Kingdom
UK MPs 1974
UK MPs 1974–1979
UK MPs 1979–1983
UK MPs 1983–1987
UK MPs 1987–1992
UK MPs 1992–1997
UK MPs 1997–2001
UK MPs 2001–2005
UK MPs 2005–2010
UK MPs 2010–2015
Alumni of Lincoln College, Oxford
People educated at Copthorne Preparatory School
People educated at Repton School
Northern Ireland Office junior ministers
Knights Bachelor
Politicians awarded knighthoods